The 1998–99 season was the 77th in the history of Hércules CF and their second consecutive season in the second division. The club participated in the Segunda División and the Copa del Rey. The season covered the period from 1 July 1998 to 30 June 1999.

Transfers

In

Out

Competitions

Overall record

Segunda División

League table

Results summary

Results by round

Matches

Copa del Rey

First round

References 

Hércules CF seasons
Hércules